The Lady Craved Excitement is a 1950 British comedy film directed by Francis Searle and written by John Gilling. It featured Hy Hazell, Michael Medwin and Sid James. An early Hammer film, it is significant as one of five films shot at Oakley Court and the first to feature its famous exterior, located next door to Bray Studios.

Plot
Cabaret artists Pat and Johnny's careers are hampered by Pat's craving for excitement. She leads them into a number of dangerous situations, but also help to uncover a conspiracy to smuggle valuable works of art out of the country.

Cast
 Hy Hazell as Pat
 Michael Medwin as Johnny
 Sidney James as Carlo
 Thelma Grigg as Julia Lafaine
 Andrew Keir as Septimus K. Peterson
 Danny Green as Boris
 John Longden as Inspector James
 Ian Wilson as Mugsy
 Barbara Hamilton as 1st Chorus Girl
 Jasmine Dee as 2nd Chorus Girl
 Gordon Mulholland as Lunatic

Critical reception
Britmovie wrote, "barely watchable by today’s standards (and probably not much more tolerable at the time), it nevertheless remains of passing interest for its cast, which includes Michael Medwin, Sid James and Andrew Keir, all of them then in the early stages of what would prove to be lengthy and successful careers."

References

1950 films
British comedy films
1950 comedy films
Hammer Film Productions films
Films set in London
Films directed by Francis Searle
Films based on radio series
British black-and-white films
1950s English-language films
1950s British films